Tazeh Kand-e Akhvond (also Romanized as Tāzeh Kand-e Ākhvond and Tāzeh Kand Ākhūnd; also known as Tazakend, Tāzeh Kand, and Tazeh Kand Alamdar) is a village in Dowlatabad Rural District, in the Central District of Marand County, East Azerbaijan Province, Iran. At the 2006 census, its population was 2,832, in 653 families.

References 

Populated places in Marand County